Browns Creek is a stream in Union County, South Carolina, in the United States.

Browns Creek was named for Gabriel Brown, a pioneer who settled near its mouth.

See also
List of rivers of South Carolina

References

Rivers of Union County, South Carolina
Rivers of South Carolina